Gregory J. Hertz (born December 30, 1957) is an American businessman and politician from Montana. Hertz is a Republican member of the Montana House of Representatives for District 12, which represents the Polson area.

Early life 
Hertz was born in Malta, Montana.

Education 
Hertz earned a Bachelor of Arts in Business Administration from University of Montana.

Career 
In 1998, Hertz became the majority owner, President and CEO of Moody's Market, Incorporated, operator of grocery stores in Polson, Montana.

On November 6, 2012, Hertz won the election and became a Republican member of Montana House of Representatives for District 11. Hertz defeated Bud Koppy with 66.61% of the votes.

On November 4, 2014, Hertz won the election and became a Republican member of Montana House of Representatives for District 12. Hertz defeated William McLaughlin with 66.35% of the votes. On November 8, 2016, as an incumbent, Hertz won the election and continued serving District 12. Hertz defeated Susan T. Evans with 64.38% of the votes. On November 6, 2018, as an incumbent, Hertz won the election and continued serving District 12. Hertz defeated Susan T. Evans with 60.63% of the votes.

Hertz served as a Majority Whip of the House during the 2015-2016 session.

Personal life 
Hertz's wife is Kate Hertz. They have 3 children. Hertz and his family live in Polson, Montana.

See also 
 Montana House of Representatives, District 11
 Montana House of Representatives, District 12

References

External links 

|-

1957 births
21st-century American politicians
Living people
Republican Party members of the Montana House of Representatives
People from Phillips County, Montana
People from Polson, Montana
Speakers of the Montana House of Representatives
University of Montana alumni